Kim Young-Sun is a South Korean footballer who plays as a defender. He is currently playing for Jeonbuk FC.

He started his professional career in 1998 for Suwon Samsung Bluewings.

References

External links
 

1975 births
South Korean footballers
Jeonbuk Hyundai Motors players
Suwon Samsung Bluewings players
K League 1 players
Living people
Association football defenders